The Ernst Museum (Hungarian : Ernst Múzeum) is an art museum located in Budapest's VI District. Since 2013, it is also home to the Robert Capa Contemporary Photography Center.

References 

Museums in Budapest
1912 establishments in Hungary